As a title, Blaze of Glory may refer to:

Music 
 Blaze of Glory (Burning Starr album), 1987
 Blaze of Glory (Flesh-n-Bone album), 2011
 Blaze of Glory (Game Theory album), 1982
 Blaze of Glory (Joe Jackson album), 1989
 Blaze of Glory (Jon Bon Jovi album), 1990
 "Blaze of Glory" (Jon Bon Jovi song), 1990
 "Blaze of Glory" (Kenny Rogers song), 1981
 "Blaze of Glory", by Audio Adrenaline from Adios: The Greatest Hits, 2006

Television and film 
 "Blaze of Glory" (Star Trek: Deep Space Nine), a 1997 television episode
Blaze o' Glory, a 1929 film
 "Blaze of Glory" (Bugs), a television episode
 "The Blaze of Glory" (The O.C.), an episode of The O.C.
 "The Blaze of Glory" (The Walking Dead: World Beyond), an episode of the first season of The Walking Dead: World Beyond

Literature 
 A Blaze of Glory, a 2012 historical novel by Jeff Shaara
 Blaze of Glory, a 2006 fantasy novel by Michael Pryor
 Blaze of Glory: The Last Ride of the Western Heroes, a 2000 series published by Marvel Comics

See also 
 Blaze Glory, a 1970 stop-motion short film
 Blades of Glory, a 2007 comedy